is a Japanese singer-songwriter from Urawa-ku, Saitama, Saitama Prefecture. He is best known for being the vocalist to the band Godiego as well as his solo career and his work as an author. Some of his compositions have been featured in video game, anime, films, and television drama soundtracks. These include the Galaxy Express 999 film, Saiyūki, Genesis Climber MOSPEADA, Soul Blazer, and Choushinsei Flashman.

One of his most popular songs was "Gandhara", which was translated into foreign languages many times and changed more than once during the translation.

His daughter Ai is also a musician and has been featured on the soundtrack of InuYasha Kanketsu-Hen.

References

External links

1952 births
Living people
Japanese mystery writers
20th-century Japanese novelists
21st-century Japanese novelists
Japanese male singer-songwriters
Japanese singer-songwriters
People from Saitama (city)
Musicians from Saitama Prefecture
20th-century Japanese male writers
21st-century male writers